Matthew Julian Todd (born 25 May 1983 in Chertsey) is an English first-class cricketer active 2003 who played for Surrey. He is a right-handed batsman and a right-arm off break bowler.

References

External links

1983 births
English cricketers
Surrey cricketers
Living people
Sportspeople from Chertsey
21st-century English people